Pityrodia iphthima is a flowering plant in the mint family Lamiaceae and is endemic to a small area in Western Australia. It is a small shrub with its branches, leaves and some of its flower parts densely covered with matted hairs. It has spike-like groups of up to forty flowers on the ends of the branches, the flowers tube-shaped, deep lilac and white, with brown spots inside.

Description
They are folded lengthwise in a V-shape with the upper surface more or less glabrous and the lower surface covered with star-like hairs, similar to those on the branches.

The petal lobes form two "lips", the upper one with two lobes and the lower one with three. The tube is sparsely hairy on the outside and mostly glabrous on the inside apart from a densely hairy ring around the ovary. The four stamens are usually enclosed within the tube, one pair shorter than the others. Flowers have only been observed in August.

This species is similar to P. augustensis but is distinguished by its relatively glabrous upper leaf surface and longer sepal tube.

Taxonomy and naming
Pityrodia iphthima was first formally described in 2007 by Kelly Shepherd from a specimen collected on the Robinson Ranges near Meekatharra and the description was published in Nuytsia. The specific epithet (iphthima) is derived from an Ancient Greek word meaning "strong", "stout" or "stalwart", referring to the harsh, rocky habitat of this species.

Distribution and habitat
This pityrodia grows on rocky hillsides of banded ironstone in the Gascoyne biogeographic region.

Conservation
Pityrodia iphthima is classified as "Priority One" by the Government of Western Australia Department of Parks and Wildlife, meaning that it is known from only one or a few locations which are potentially at risk.

References

iphthima
Plants described in 2007
Flora of Western Australia
Taxa named by Kelly Anne Shepherd